Scott Redl (born July 19, 1961) is a former Canadian football offensive lineman who played seven seasons in the Canadian Football League (CFL) with the Saskatchewan Roughriders and Winnipeg Blue Bombers. He was drafted by the Saskatchewan Roughriders as a territorial exemption in the 1983 CFL Draft. He played CIS football at the University of Saskatchewan and attended Evan Hardy Collegiate in Saskatoon, Saskatchewan. Redl was also a member of the BC Lions. He is the younger brother of fellow CFL player Doug Redl.

Early years
Redl played high school football for the Evan Hardy Collegiate Souls. He helped the team win several provincial football championships.

College career
Redl played CIS football for the Saskatchewan Huskies. He earned Outstanding Lineman honors his final two seasons and was a Western Intercollegiate Football League All-Star his senior year. He spent time at both defensive and offensive line for the Huskies.

Professional career
Redl was selected by the Saskatchewan Roughriders of the CFL as a territorial exemption in the 1983 CFL Draft. He played for the Roughriders from 1983 to 1987. He was traded to the BC Lions in 1988. Redl signed with the CFL's Winnipeg Blue Bombers in 1989 and played for the team from 1989 to 1990, winning the 78th Grey Cup in 1990. He retired following the 1990 season.

References

External links
Just Sports Stats

Living people
1961 births
Canadian football offensive linemen
Canadian football defensive linemen
Saskatchewan Huskies football players
Saskatchewan Roughriders players
BC Lions players
Winnipeg Blue Bombers players
Players of Canadian football from Saskatchewan
Sportspeople from Saskatoon